Harold Dewolf Kantner (February 23, 1886 – December 11, 1973) was a pioneer aviator.

Biography
He was born on February 23, 1886, in Meadville, Pennsylvania. He attended the John Bevins Moisant aviation school and was taught to fly by Andre Haupert. Kantner and Etienne Dormoy built a Bleriot monoplane with a 50 horsepower Gnome et Rhône engine in which Kantner soloed on June 30, 1911, and was given Fédération Aéronautique Internationale certificate number 65 on October 14, 1911, in Mineola, New York. He was instructor at the Yale group in Buffalo, New York. After World War I he worked as designer and test pilot for Continental motors, Aeromarine, Fairchild and Convair. He retired from Convair in 1961. He died on December 11, 1973.

References

External links
 Kantner at Flickr Commons via San Diego Air and Space Museum

1886 births
1973 deaths
Aviators from Pennsylvania
Members of the Early Birds of Aviation